Khalaj (also known as Khalajābād) is a village in Varzaq Rural District, in the Central District of Faridan County, Isfahan Province, Iran. At the 2006 census, its population was 126, in 43 families.

References 

Populated places in Faridan County